Anthemis punctata, called the Sicilian chamomile, is a species of flowering plant in the genus Anthemis, native to Algeria and Tunisia, and introduced to Sicily, Great Britain and Ireland. It has gained the Royal Horticultural Society's Award of Garden Merit as Anthemis punctata subsp. cupaniana, which may well refer to Anthemis cupaniana.

Subtaxa
The following subspecies are currently accepted:
Anthemis punctata subsp. kabylica (Batt.) Oberpr.
Anthemis punctata subsp. punctata

References

punctata
Flora of Algeria
Flora of Tunisia
Plants described in 1791